Low Moor railway station serves the villages of Low Moor and Oakenshaw in the south of Bradford, West Yorkshire, England. The station is situated on the Calder Valley Line between Bradford Interchange and Halifax.

The present station at Low Moor was opened on 2 April 2017. One train per hour serves the station in both directions, and there are also four direct Grand Central services to London King's Cross each day.

Station facilities include 128 car parking spaces, CCTV, accessible platforms, waiting shelters, passenger information displays and public address system.

Transport links

The station is promoted as a Park and Ride facility, being close to the M62 and M606 motorways. There is also direct access to the Spen Valley Greenway cycle track, part of National Cycle Route 66.

Bus service 268, operated by Arriva provides regular onward connections towards Bradford city centre, Cleckheaton, Liversedge, Heckmondwike and Dewsbury.

Original station

The original station at Low Moor was situated at the junction of two routes - the line to Halifax and Greetland through the Calder Valley and that via the Spen Valley to  via , both built by the Manchester and Leeds Railway.  It opened in 1848 and initially acted a terminus for both lines, as the continuation towards Bradford Exchange was not yet complete (the tunnels north of the station and at Bowling were still under construction at this point).  Through running to Bradford eventually began in 1850, to Manchester Victoria in January 1852 and to Leeds via  (over the Leeds, Bradford and Halifax Junction Railway) in 1854.  Low Moor quickly became an important interchange station, as there was initially no direct route between Bradford Exchange and the LB&HJR route to Leeds and so many trains to/from Halifax and Manchester carried portions for both cities that were attached or joined here (a practice that continued even after Exchange was expanded and linked to the Leeds route in 1867).

The introduction of DMUs over the Calder Valley route in January 1962 saw the loss of much of its interchange traffic and in June 1965, it was closed to passenger traffic under the Beeching axe along with the Spen Valley Line. Goods traffic ceased two years later and the station was then demolished.

The station site was later used for the Transperience museum which was open for a brief period in the 1990s. The Spen Valley Greenway was built on the route of the Spen Valley line after its closure to freight in 1981, as far as Thornhill Junction in Dewsbury.

Present station

Metro planned to build a new station at Low Moor by 2011–2012. A lack of capacity on the line meant that development was put on hold through 2008–09, until track improvement work at Mill Lane Junction in Bradford was completed and a new timetable introduced.

In June 2009, £5.5 million funding was allocated for the station and it was announced that a detailed design plan and business case would be developed. These were completed in May 2010, confirming the station's location on New Works Road.

After the 2010 general election and subsequent Spending Review, a further assessment of the West Yorkshire Strategic Programme of Schemes confirmed that the new station at Low Moor remained a key priority within the transport aspirations of West Yorkshire. The public consultation for the scheme was held in November 2011.

Estimated completion was delayed into 2015, as the curvature of the track led to complications meeting engineering safety requirements for the new platforms. West Yorkshire Integrated Transport Authority (WYITA) released funding for the station in March 2014 and submitted a planning application to Bradford Council.

There were further delays during construction of the car park over suspected disused mine workings. Exhaustive surveys initially could not verify their precise locations, but two were eventually discovered under the station site.

Opening was delayed to summer 2016, and then to May 2017. This date was revised again, and the station opened to passenger trains on Sunday, 2 April 2017. The total cost of the project was £10.8 million.

Service pattern
Currently, Low Moor has the following service pattern:
One train per hour to  
One train per hour to  via 
Four trains per day to  only
Four direct trains per day to London Kings Cross via 

From the winter 2019 timetable change, the Huddersfield service will start/terminate at Bradford rather than running through to Leeds on weekdays and Saturdays, but to compensate for this the hourly Leeds - Manchester Victoria - Chester service will start calling throughout the day.  This improves the overall service pattern at the station to two departures per hour to both Halifax and Bradford, with hourly through trains to Leeds and Manchester.  Sunday services remain unchanged.

References

External links

 Plan of Low Moor station in the 1950s
 Low Moor station on navigable 1947 O. S. map

 

Railway stations in Bradford
Former Lancashire and Yorkshire Railway stations
Railway stations in Great Britain opened in 1848
Railway stations in Great Britain closed in 1965
Beeching closures in England
Railway stations in Great Britain opened in 2017
Railway stations served by Grand Central Railway
Railway stations opened by Network Rail
Northern franchise railway stations
Reopened railway stations in Great Britain